Danby is an unincorporated village and census-designated place (CDP) in the towns of Danby and Mount Tabor, Rutland County, Vermont, United States. As of the 2020 census, it had a population of 200.

The CDP is in southern Rutland County, split evenly between the town of Danby to the west and the town of Mount Tabor to the east. U.S. Route 7 passes through the east side of the community, leading north  to Wallingford and south  to Manchester Center.

References 

Populated places in Rutland County, Vermont
Census-designated places in Rutland County, Vermont
Census-designated places in Vermont